Fort Meadow Reservoir is a 260-acre pond in between the town of Hudson and city of Marlborough, Massachusetts, United States.

Amory Maynard, the founder of Maynard, Massachusetts, originally operated a saw mill on the channel leading into Fort Meadow Reservoir before the City of Boston acquired his water rights. The Reservoir lies 
 above sea level.

The Fort Meadow Reservoir ends at the borders of Hudson and Marlborough. 
The pond consists of a primary and secondary basin, separated by a narrows near the center of the two. The primary basin is split into two sections by a road.

Two public beaches are located on the secondary basin. Centennial Beach lies on the Hudson side while Memorial Beach lies on the Marlborough side.

Motorized boating is allowed, making it a popular local destination for recreation.

References

Reservoirs in Massachusetts
Lakes of Middlesex County, Massachusetts